A byline indicates the name of the author of a newspaper or magazine article.

Byline may also refer to:

Byline (TV series), 1950s mystery series
By-Line: Ernest Hemingway, a 1967 collection of newspaper articles by Ernest Hemingway 
Byline Bank, Chicago-based bank
Bylines, the portion of goal line outside the goalposts in a football pitch
A touch-line or sideline in sports
Byline Times, an online newspaper

See also
Dateline (disambiguation)
Byliner, an imprint of Pronoun publishing platform